The Baylor Bears men's basketball statistical leaders are individual statistical leaders of the Baylor Bears men's basketball program in various categories, including points, rebounds, assists, steals, and blocks. Within those areas, the lists identify single-game, single-season, and career leaders. The Bears represent Baylor University in the NCAA Division I Big 12 Conference.

Baylor began competing in intercollegiate basketball in 1907. However, the school's record book does not generally list records from before the 1950s, as records from before this period are often incomplete and inconsistent. Since scoring was much lower in this era, and teams played much fewer games during a typical season, it is likely that few or no players from this era would appear on these lists anyway.

The NCAA has recorded scoring statistics throughout the "modern era" of basketball, which it defines as starting with the 1937–38 season, the first after the center jump after each made field goal was abolished. Individual rebounding was first recorded in 1950–51, as were individual assists. While rebounding has been recorded in every subsequent season, the NCAA stopped recording individual assists after the 1951–52 season. Assists were not reinstated as an official statistic in Division I until the 1983–84 season. Blocks and steals were first recorded in D-I in 1988–89. Baylor's record books include players in all named statistics, regardless of whether they were officially recorded by the NCAA or any other national governing body.

These lists are updated through the end of the 2020–21 season.

Scoring

Rebounds

Assists

Steals

Blocks

References

Lists of college basketball statistical leaders by team
Statistical